The rolling stock of the Bay Area Rapid Transit (BART) system consists of 782 self-propelled electric multiple units, built in four separate orders. 

To run a typical peak morning commute, BART requires 579 cars. Of those, 535 are scheduled to be in active service; the others are used to build up four spare trains (used to maintain on-time service). The remaining 90 cars are in for repair, maintenance, or some type of planned modification work. All trains on the separate automated guideway transit line are in regular use without spares. Alstom (originally Bombardier) is manufacturing a complete replacement of the mainline fleet. With the withdrawal and retirement of the older fleet, there will be 775 vehicles in total, with long-term goals of eventually increasing this to 1,200 cars.

The automated guideway transit line utilizes off-the-shelf cable car technology developed by Doppelmayr Cable Car: the Cable Liner. The eBART extension was constructed to more traditional specifications and uses Stadler GTW articulated diesel multiple units previously utilized in other systems.

It also uses flat-edge rail, rather than typical rail that angles slightly inward. These factors have complicated maintenance of the system, as it requires custom wheelsets, brake systems, and track maintenance vehicles. A full consist, which will fill the system's platforms, is ten units, equaling . 

BART trains are unique among American rapid transit systems as they have proper gangway connections and passengers are permitted to walk between cars, not unlike an open gangway system.

Original fleet

A and B series 

The A and B cars were built from 1968 to 1975 by Rohr Industries, an aerospace manufacturing company that had recently started mass-transit equipment manufacturing. The first of these cars were delivered in 1970. The A cars were designed as leading or trailing cars only, with an aerodynamic fiberglass operator's cab housing train control equipment and BART's two-way communication system, and extending  longer than the B-cars. A and B cars can seat 60 passengers comfortably, and under crush load, carry over 200 passengers. B cars have no operator's cab and are used in the middle of trains to carry passengers only. However, since each car is self-propelled, the B cars do have "hostler controls" allowing the cars to be operated by themselves at low speeds inside a yard.

As early as 1978, BART realized that it had ordered too many A cars, which were unable to operate in the middle of train, and too few B cars. Over time, about 113 A cars (about 2/3 of the A car fleet) were converted into B cars by removing their fiberglass cabs and installing the inter-car connection equipment.

Currently, BART operates 56 A cars and 341 B cars. To be able to maintain the vehicles until they are taken out of service, the workshop regularly procures computers on the second-hand market that can still address the old systems. Since the first series were newly designed, there are hardly any standard components, which makes maintenance more difficult.

C series 

Just as BART had realized in the mid-1970s that it had ordered too many A cars, it also learned that it took more time than desired to change the length of a train. BART had originally planned to bring cars into a yard after the morning rush, remove B cars to shorten a train for midday service, before returning to a yard to add cars for the evening rush. Ultimately this procedure resulted in long downtimes and increased the number of operators needed.

BART's solution to both issues was a new design, the C car. These cars had an operators cab like the A cars, but could be reconfigured to allow them to be used as an intermediate car like the B cars. When placed in the middle of a train consist, the operator's cab is closed off, and a door in the nose opens, allowing passengers to pass through to the next car (always another C car cab). This allowed BART to make one long train that could be quickly "break" into two trains outside of a yard. Crews could also do the reverse and "make" one long train from two shorter consists. To add the operators cab, while maintaining the same length as a B car, the C cars could only seat 56 passengers (a loss of 4 seats).

The first C cars, referred to as C1 cars, were built by Alstom between 1987 and 1989. The second order of C cars, built by Morrison–Knudsen, are known as C2 cars. At the time of their construction, the C2 cars also featured flip-up seats which could be folded to accommodate wheelchair users; these seats were later removed during refurbishment. 

Currently, BART operates 150 C cars.

Refurbishments 

After about 25 years in service, the A and B car fleet was rebuilt, using newer technologies and lessons learned when building the C cars. Among the changes were a conversion from DC to AC propulsion (detailed below), rebuilt trucks and suspension, and a complete cleaning and repair to the exterior and interior of the cars. The work was done between 1998 and 2002 at first by Pittsburg, California-based ADtranz and later by Bombardier which acquired the company in 2001.

A cars, (fleet numbers 101-276) were either rebuilt while retaining their cab (and renamed A2 cars, fleet numbers 1164-1276), or rebuilt without a cab (converted into B2 cars, fleet numbers 1838-1913). B cars (fleet numbers 501-774, 801-837) were rebuilt into B2 cars (fleet numbers 1501-1774, 1801-1837).

Because one of the original design goals was for all BART riders to be seated, the older cars had fewer provisions such as grab bars for standing passengers. In the late 2000s BART began modifying some of the C2 cars to test features such as hand-straps and additional areas for luggage, wheelchairs and bicycles. These new features were later added to the A, B, and C1 cars.

Prior to 2012, all BART cars featured upholstered seats. It was reported in 2011 that several strains of molds and bacteria were found on fabric seats on BART trains, even after wiping with antiseptic. These included bacteria from fecal contamination. In April, BART announced it would spend $2 million in the next year to replace the dirty seats. The new seats would feature vinyl-covered upholstery which would be easier to clean. The transition to the new seats was completed in December 2014.

Originally all the cars had carpeted flooring. Due to similar concerns regarding cleanliness, the carpeting in all of the cars has been removed. The A and B, and C2 cars now feature vinyl flooring in either grey or blue coloring, while the C1 cars feature a spray-on composite flooring.

Traction motors 
Prior to rebuilding, the Direct Current (DC) traction motors used on the 439 Rohr BART cars were Model 1463B with chopper from Westinghouse, who also built the automatic train control system for BART. The Rohr cars were rebuilt with ADtranz model 1507C 3-phase alternating current (AC) traction motors with insulated-gate bipolar transistor (IGBT) inverters. The Westinghouse motors are still in use on the Alstom C (C1) and Morrison-Knudsen C2 cars and the motors that were removed from the Rohr cars were retained as spares.

The HVAC system on the Rohr BART cars before rehabilitation were built by Thermo King, when it was a subsidiary of Westinghouse. The current HVAC systems on the rebuilt Rohr-built Gen 1 cars were built by Westcode and possibly also ADtranz who had subcontracted the HVAC system to Westcode.

Noise 
Many BART passengers have noted that the system is noisy, with a 2010 survey by the San Francisco Chronicle measuring up to 100 decibels (comparable to the noise level of a jackhammer) in the Transbay Tube between San Francisco and Oakland, and still more than 90 decibels in 23 other locations. According to BART, the noise in the tunnel used to be "compared to banshees, screech owls, or Doctor Who's TARDIS run amok".

However, then-chief BART spokesperson Linton Johnson stated that BART averages 70–80 dB, below the danger zone, and according to a 1997 study by the National Academy of Sciences, BART ranks as among the quietest transit systems in the nation. Much of BART is under ground and curvy, even in the Transbay Tube, and has much higher peak operating speeds than many other systems in the country.

Train noise on curves is caused by the wheels slipping along the rails. This slippage also causes noise and surface damage called corrugation. The process by which the noise and corrugation occur is:
 Pairs of wheels are attached to one another with an axle such that they must have the same rotational speed, but on a curve the distances the outer and inner wheels travel are different. As a result, the wheels must slip along the rails.
 This slippage causes the wheel and track to wear and become uneven (corrugated).
 This corrugation causes more noise and corrugation, not only in the original location but elsewhere in the system.
In 2015, after replacing  and grinding down (smoothing)  of rail in the tube, BART reported a reduction of noise there and positive feedback from riders. BART also announced that the new train cars expected to enter service in December 2016 (see below) will be quieter, thanks to "'micro-plug' doors [that] help seal out noise".

Decommissioning 
If Federal Transit Administration funds were used in the purchase of a vehicle and that vehicle is deemed to have a value over $5,000 at the time of sale, the FTA is entitled to a reimbursement proportional to its contribution to that vehicle when it was initially bought. This applies even if the car is donated free of charge.

The older cars began retirement in November 2019 when Car 2528 (a C2 car) was the first released from BART ownership. The car was removed from service in 2014 by which time it had run  and was held in reserve for spare parts. Four additional C2 cars, three B2 cars, and two C1 cars (totalling ten cars) were additionally sent to the Schnitzer Steel facility in Oakland to be evaluated and recycled.

BART strategically targeted the C2 cars to be the first in the legacy fleet to be completely decommissioned. The C2 cars had a multitude of issues including HVAC units that were the most likely in the fleet to break down, passenger doors that would often come off their tracks, and operator cabs with windows that would frequently fail and windshield wipers that would become stuck. By August 2021, all 80 of the C2 cars had been scrapped.

Starting in late 2021, BART plans to target the remaining C1 cars for decommissioning. In March 2022, BART announced eight finalists for receipt of decommissioned cars. Planned reuses include a museum at the Oakland Coliseum, a short-term rental, bars, and training facilities for firefighters in Hayward and Concord; an A, B, and C car will go to the Western Railway Museum.

Fleet of the Future (D and E series) 

In a 2010 APTA study, the average age of BART's mainline fleet was reported to be 30 years, longer than the usual lifespan of 25 years. Despite the purchase of newer cars over the years, the majority of the active fleet in 2016 was over 40 years old and had traveled over a million miles. Because of this, they have been increasingly prone to frequent breakdowns and repairs, decreasing the number of available cars and in turn increasing congestion, especially with the need to increase the fleet size for extensions to the network. Consequently, in 2009, BART began the process of expanding and replacing its railcar fleet. By 2010, it had received proposals from five suppliers, and on May 10, 2012, it awarded a $896.3 million contract to railcar manufacturer Bombardier (during delivery the company was bought by Alstom) with an order for 410 new cars, split into a base order of 260 cars and a first option order of 150 additional cars. The car was designed by Morelli Designers, an industrial design firm based in Montréal, Canada. On November 21, 2013, BART purchased 365 more cars, for a total fleet size of 775 new railcars, while also accelerating the delivery schedule by 21 months (from 10 cars per month up to 16 cars per month) and lowering procurement costs by approximately $135 million. The contract requires that at least  of its value be spent on U.S.-built parts.

The new fleet is composed of two different types of cars: 310 cab cars (D cars) and 465 non-cab cars (E cars). Both types have bike racks, new vinyl seats (54 per car), and passenger information systems that display next stop information.

A major difference is an extra set of doorways on each side of the new cars to speed up boarding and alighting. They also include redesigned seating, bike racks, digital displays that display travel information, and automatic announcements. Due to potential access issues for people with disabilities, the pilot car layout was modified by the BART board in February 2015 to include two wheelchair spaces in the center of the car, as well as alternative layouts for bike and flexible open spaces.

The first test car was unveiled in April 2016; upon approval, the first 10 cars were expected to be in service in December 2016, and at least 20 by December 2017. This was delayed several times until the production cars were expected to be delivered in October 2017. Delivery of all 775 cars was initially expected to be completed by Fall 2022, with all cars in service by 2023. Bombardier initially agreed to speed production to have all cars available by the end of 2021 and in service by 2022.

In early November 2017, a test train failed a CPUC regulatory inspection due to door issues, leaving the planned late November revenue service in doubt. The first ten-car train received CPUC certification on January 17, 2018, and began revenue service two days later on January 19. Plans to have 198 new cars by July 2018 did not materialize, and the agency had put only 20 in service at that time. After only running on the Richmond–Warm Springs/South Fremont line since January, a set of D and E cars began transbay service in October 2018.

In November 2018, BART announced they had negotiated to extend their purchase options to a total of 1,200 cars, though reports in 2019 stated that this deal was still not final. By the end of March 2019, 65 cars were in use; four 10-car trains for revenue service and the remainder for training. In June 2019, with 84 total cars delivered, Bombardier announced it would be moving production from their New York-based plant to a new facility shared with Hitachi Rail in Pittsburg, California in the East Bay.

In January 2021, BART stopped accepting new cars pending reliability improvements to be made by Bombardier. That same month, the struggling Bombardier sold its transportation division to Alstom, which said it would work to recover operations. BART was not alone with issues with Bombardier equipment. Before the Alstom deal, the company had seen declining profits largely caused by a series of major delays in delivering new fleets of trains (including the Flexity streetcars for Toronto and R179 subway cars for New York City) and reliability problems once trains were placed in service. 

BART resumed accepting new cars in February 2022. As of December 1, 2022, BART has received 438 D and E cars, of which 429 have been certified for service and 308 are actually in service. Of the 56 trains used for peak service, 32 were made of new cars.

AGT fleet 

The Coliseum–Oakland International Airport line uses a completely separate and independently operated fleet as it uses off-the-shelf cable car-based automated guideway transit technology. The fleet consists of four Cable Liner trains built by Doppelmayr Cable Car arranged as three-car sets, totaling twelve cars. The system is designed to be expanded to four-car trains with a capacity of 148 passengers in the future if necessary.

eBART fleet 

eBART is a spur line built to different design standards than the majority of the mainline; it is non-electrified  and serviced by diesel-powered light rail. The vehicle procurement for the line included eight Stadler GTW trains, with two options to purchase six more. Stadler was the sole bidder on the contract. The first was delivered in June 2016. The trains are diesel multiple units (DMU's) with 2/6 articulated power units, and are based on models previously used in Austin, Dallas and New Jersey.

Maintenance

Notes

References

Further reading 

Rolling Stock
Multiple units by railway company
Electric multiple units of the United States
Train-related introductions in 2018
Train-related introductions in 1972
Train-related introductions in 1987
Train-related introductions in 1994
1000 V DC railway electrification
Bombardier Transportation multiple units
Lists of rolling stock
Alstom multiple units
Morrison-Knudsen multiple units